Glomar Challenger Basin is a northeast trending undersea basin in the central Ross Sea continental shelf named for the research ship Glomar Challenger. The name was approved by the Advisory Committee for Undersea Features in June 1988.

References

Oceanic basins of the Southern Ocean
Landforms of Victoria Land